Resurreccion "Cion" Marrero Acop (November 21, 1947 – May 28, 2021) was a Filipino politician and doctor.

She was a member of the House of Representatives of the Philippines, representing the 2nd district of Antipolo, from 2019 until her death in 2021. 

Acop's husband, former police general Romeo Acop, served in the same seat from 2010 until 2019 and again since 2022.

Acop died of complications from COVID-19 on May 28, 2021, at the age of 73.

References

1947 births
2021 deaths
PDP–Laban politicians
Members of the House of Representatives of the Philippines from Antipolo
Deaths from the COVID-19 pandemic in the Philippines
People from Antipolo